Chvalkovice is a municipality and village in Vyškov District in the South Moravian Region of the Czech Republic. It has about 300 inhabitants.

Notable people
Andreas Nemetz (1799–1846), bandmaster and composer

References

Villages in Vyškov District